Géjza Valent (born 3 October 1953 in Prague) is a retired male discus thrower from Czechoslovakia, who won the bronze medal at the 1983 World Championships. He set a personal best throw of 69.70 metres on 26 August 1984 at a meet in Nitra. Today, he continues to compete in veterans championships.

His father, Géjza Valent, Sr., was also a discus thrower and was a medallist at the 1954 World Student Games.

International competitions

References

External links 

sports-reference

1953 births
Living people
Czech male discus throwers
Czechoslovak male discus throwers
Athletes (track and field) at the 1988 Summer Olympics
Olympic athletes of Czechoslovakia
Athletes from Prague
World Athletics Championships medalists
World Athletics Championships athletes for Czechoslovakia